Calvary Cemetery is a Roman Catholic cemetery located in St. Louis, Missouri and operated by the Archdiocese of St. Louis. Founded in 1854, it is the second oldest cemetery in the Archdiocese. Calvary Cemetery contains 470 acres (1.9 km2) of land and more than 300,000 graves, including those of General William Tecumseh Sherman, Dred Scott, Tennessee Williams, Kate Chopin, Louis Chauvin and Auguste Chouteau.

History
In 1849 a cholera epidemic struck St. Louis and claimed the lives of more than 4,000 people. This disaster prompted city officials to pass an ordinance banning the creation of new cemeteries within city limits, as it was thought that such a measure could prevent additional people from becoming sick. At the same time, existing cemeteries in St. Louis were nearly full and had no room to expand.

Recognizing the need for a new rural cemetery, Archbishop Peter Richard Kenrick purchased Senator Henry Clay’s “Old Orchard Farm” in 1853, located several miles northwest of St. Louis. Kenrick initially set aside the eastern half of the 323-acre farm for a new cemetery, and kept the western half for himself, where he lived for many years in the former Clay Mansion. Calvary Cemetery opened for burials in 1854, with Archbishop Kenrick as its first president.

Prior to the establishment of Calvary Cemetery, parts of the Clay farm had served as a burial place for Native Americans and soldiers from nearby Fort Bellefontaine. After 1854, these remains were reinterred in a mass grave under a large crucifix at one of the highest points in the cemetery. Graves at other Catholic cemeteries across St. Louis, such as Old Cathedral, Rock Springs, Holy Trinity, Old St. Patrick's, New Bremen and others were also dug up and reinterred at Calvary. As the number of graves steadily grew, the cemetery acquired more land, eventually reaching its present-day size of 470 acres. It has more than 300,000 casketed graves, and two public mausoleums and columbaria, as well as a number of private family mausoleums and sarcophagi.

Space for full-casket traditional burials is available for the next 300 years at Calvary Cemetery, according to Archdiocesan sources.  Many former St. Louisans choose to be returned to Calvary for burial, including August Chouteau X, a great-great-great grandson of the city's founder, who lived most of his life in Los Angeles, California. The brother of noted writer and dramatist Tennessee Williams chose to have him buried here, bringing his body from New York City where he had died.

In 2003, a Lewis and Clark Bicentennial Grant funded the construction of a monument at Calvary Cemetery to honor four Nez Perce men who had traveled to St. Louis in 1831 from their home in present-day Idaho. When they arrived in St. Louis, these men had to rely on hand gestures to communicate, as they could find no one who spoke their language. Two of the men, Black Eagle and Speaking Eagle, died of illness while in St. Louis and are buried in Calvary Cemetery.

Notable Calvary burials
Louis Auguste Benoist (1803–1867), pioneer banker and financier
Mary Odilia Berger (1823–1880), founder of Franciscan Sisters of Mary, which operates hospitals in Midwest
Thomas Biddle (1790–1831), military hero during the War of 1812; killed in a duel with Missouri Congressman Spencer Pettis on Bloody Island
Lewis V. Bogy (1813–1877), United States Senator (1873–1877)
Martin Stanislaus Brennan (1845–1927), Catholic priest, scientist, and author
Patrick E. Burke (c. 1830–1864), officer in the Union Army during the Civil War, Missouri state legislator
Thomas Ambrose Butler (1837–1897), Irish-American priest and poet
Mickey Carroll (1919–2009), Munchkin in The Wizard of Oz film
Philando Castile (1983-2016), victim of high-profile police shooting
Alfonso J. Cervantes (1920–1983), Mayor of St. Louis (1965–1973)
Louis Chauvin (1881–1908), ragtime musician
Kate Chopin (1851–1904), author
François Chouteau (1797–1838), fur trader and businessman, founder of Kansas City, Missouri
René Auguste Chouteau (1740–1829), fur trader, co-founder of the city of St. Louis
Powhatan Henry Clarke (1862–1893), United States Army First Lieutenant and Medal of Honor recipient
Pierre-Jean De Smet (1801–1873), Belgian Jesuit priest and missionary to the Native Americans
Thomas Anthony Dooley III (1927–1961), physician and humanitarian
Charles and Ray Eames, designers and architects
James Brailsford Erwin (1856–1924), brigadier general
Daniel M. Frost (1823–1900), brigadier general in the Confederate States Army
Anthony Giordano (1915–1980), boss of the St. Louis crime family
Charles Gratiot (1786–1855), Chief Engineer of the United States Army Corps of Engineers
Robert E. Hannegan (1903–1949), St. Louis politician
Martin Wilkes Heron (1850–1920), bartender and mixologist, creator of the liqueur known as Southern Comfort 
John Joseph Kain (1841-1903), a Roman Catholic Archbishop of Saint Louis
Ted Kennedy (1865–1907), inventor of the baseball catcher's mitt, baseball pitcher, and sporting goods manufacturer, in Baseball Hall of Fame.
Peter Richard Kenrick (1806–1896), first Catholic archbishop west of the Mississippi River
Charles Lucas (1792–1817), entrepreneur and legislator in Missouri Territory; killed in a duel with U.S. Senator Thomas Hart Benton on Bloody Island
John Baptiste Charles Lucas (1758–1842), U.S. Representative who donated land for the Old Courthouse
Alexander McNair (1775–1826), first governor of the state of Missouri (1820–1824)
Virginia Sarpy Peugnet (1827–1917), one of the three original grand dames of St. Louis, Missouri.
James T. Rapier (1837–1883), one of Alabama's three black congressmen during Reconstruction

Thomas C. Reynolds (1821–1887), Confederate governor of Missouri from 1862 to 1865 
Phyllis Schlafly (1924-2016), A movement conservative and author known for leading the opposition to the Equal Rights Amendment
Dred Scott (1799–1858), slave who sued for freedom, resulting in the landmark U.S. Supreme Court decision Dred Scott v. Sandford
Ellen Ewing Sherman (1824–1888), wife of General William Tecumseh Sherman
William Tecumseh Sherman (1820–1891), U.S. Army general, noted for his "March to the Sea" through Georgia during the Civil War. Sherman was not Catholic. 
Antoine Soulard (1766–1825), last Surveyor General of Upper Louisiana for the Spanish government
Marie Julia Cérre Soulard (1775–1845) was an American landowner. Soulard donated the land that hosts Soulard Farmers Market to the city of St. Louis, Missouri. 
Raymond Tucker (1896–1970), mayor of St. Louis (1953–1965)
John Wesley Turner (1833–1899), Union Army general during the Civil War
John Vitale (1909–1982), Cosa Nostra boss in St. Louis
James Wall (1863–1927), comedian and minstrel
Tennessee Williams (1911–1983), Pulitzer Prize-winning American playwright
St. Louis Jane Doe (?–1983), an unidentified child who was found murdered in an abandoned house. She is buried in the Garden of Innocents, a section of the cemetery designated for unidentified decedents

See also
List of United States cemeteries
Bellefontaine Cemetery

References

External links
 Calvary Cemetery Website
 
 “Calvary Cemetery, St. Louis, Missouri,” The Monumental News, June 1894, pp. 283–285.

1854 establishments in Missouri
Cemeteries in St. Louis
History of St. Louis
Roman Catholic Archdiocese of St. Louis
Roman Catholic cemeteries in the United States